Burke Road is a major north–south thoroughfare in Melbourne, Australia. It runs from Ivanhoe East to Caulfield East and through the major shopping district at Camberwell.

It is aligned with the western boundary of Elgar's Special Survey, and does not conform to the  interval cadastral survey grid for Melbourne.

Route
Burke Road starts at the intersection with Lower Heidelberg and Maltravers Roads, heading south as a dual-lane, single-carriageway road through Ivanhoe East until crossing over the Yarra River, where it widens to a four-lane, dual-carriageway road, crosses the Eastern Freeway, and continues south until it reaches the intersection with High Street, Kilby and Doncaster Roads, where it narrows to a four-lane single-carriageway road. It continues south through Balwyn, over the Lilydale railway line and through Camberwell Junction at Camberwell, crossing the Monash Freeway and Glen Waverley railway line at Glen Iris, eventually to terminate at Princes Highway in Caulfield East, just outside Monash University's Caulfield campus.

Tram route 72 runs along the road between Whitehorse Road in Deepdene, and Malvern Road in Glen Iris.

History
Burke Road was originally known as Boundary, West Boundary or New Cross Road.

The Country Roads Board (later VicRoads) declared Burke Road a Main Road in June 1983, from Main Heidelberg-Eltham Road (Lower Heidelberg Road) at Ivanhoe East to Gardiners Creek at Glen Iris.

Burke Road was signed as Metropolitan Route 17 between Ivanhoe East and Caulfield East in 1965. Metropolitan Route 17 continues south, with a brief concurrency along Princes Highway, via Grange Road eventually to Moorabbin.

The passing of the Road Management Act 2004 granted the responsibility of overall management and development of Victoria's major arterial roads to VicRoads: in 2004, VicRoads re-declared the road as Burke Road (Arterial #5874), beginning at Main Heidelberg-Eltham Road (Lower Heidelberg Road) at Ivanhoe East and ending at Princes Highway in Caulfield East.

Major intersections

See also

Notes and references

Streets in Melbourne
Shopping districts and streets in Australia
Transport in the City of Banyule
Transport in the City of Glen Eira
Transport in the City of Boroondara
Buildings and structures in the City of Boroondara
Transport in the City of Stonnington
Bridges in Melbourne